Juncus scirpoides, the needlepod rush, is a species of flowering plant in the family Juncaceae, native to the central and eastern United States. It prefers wet sandy soils, and among the many places it grows it is common in the enigmatic Carolina bays.

References

scirpoides
Endemic flora of the United States
Flora of the Southeastern United States
Flora of Illinois
Flora of Indiana
Flora of Kansas
Flora of Michigan
Flora of Missouri
Flora of Nebraska
Flora of New Jersey
Flora of New York (state)
Flora of Oklahoma
Flora of Pennsylvania
Flora of Texas
Flora of West Virginia
Plants described in 1789
Flora without expected TNC conservation status